Gaudry is a surname. Notable people with the surname include:

 Bryce Gaudry (1942–2019), Australian politician
 Jean Albert Gaudry
 Neil Gaudry, Canadian politician
 Roger Gaudry, chemist and businessman
 Tracey Gaudry, Australian sport administrator

See also
 Waldric